Geert Grauss (9 July 1882 – 1 October 1929) was a Dutch painter. His work was part of the painting event in the art competition at the 1928 Summer Olympics.

References

1882 births
1929 deaths
20th-century Dutch painters
Dutch male painters
Olympic competitors in art competitions
Painters from Middelburg
20th-century Dutch male artists